Framsókn may refer to:
Progressive Party (Iceland) (Framsóknarflokkurinn)
Progress (Faroe Islands) Political party in the Faroe Islands (Framsókn)